This is a list of the 59 Members of Parliament (MPs) elected to the House of Commons of the United Kingdom by Scottish constituencies for the Fifty-Seventh Parliament of the United Kingdom (2017 to 2019) at the 2017 United Kingdom general election.

Composition

List

See also 

 Lists of MPs for constituencies in Scotland

Lists of UK MPs 2017–2019
Lists of MPs for constituencies in Scotland
2017 United Kingdom general election